Beshariq is a district of Fergana Region in Uzbekistan. The capital lies at the city Beshariq. The district consists of one city (Beshariq), 10 urban-type settlements (Nafosat, Zarqaynar, Kapayangi, Qumqishloq, Oqtovuq, Rapqon, Tovul, Uzun, Chimboy, Manguobod) and 9 rural communities.

References

Districts of Uzbekistan
Fergana Region